Alya Hassan (born ) is an  Emirati female volleyball player. She was part of the United Arab Emirates women's national volleyball team.

She won the bronze medal at the 2011 Pan Arab Games.

References

External links

http://gulfnews.com/sport/athletics/uae-get-off-to-impressive-start-in-games-volleyball-1.774506

1987 births
Living people
Emirati women's volleyball players
Place of birth missing (living people)